GT25 Live! - En scen vid en plats is a live album from Swedish pop group Gyllene Tider, released on 24 November 2004. The album includes live performances from the group's 2004 25th anniversary tour.

Track listing
"Intro: GT25" - 0.44
"En sten vid en sjö i en skog" - 2:35 (Jönköping)
"Juni, juli, augusti" - 3:41 (Halmstad II)
"(Dansar inte lika bra som) sjömän" - 2:50 (Halmstad II)
"Det hjärta som brinner" - 3:13 (Jönköping)
"Fån telefon" - 3:26 (Jönköping)
"Flickorna på TV 2" - 3:39 (Eskilstuna)
"(Hon vill ha) Puls" - 4:14 (Norrköping)
"Tuffa tider (för en drömmare)" - 3:31 (Helsingborg)
"Ljudet av ett annat hjärta" - 3:28 (Halmstad I)
"Ska vi älska, så ska vi älska till Buddy Holly" - 4.22 (Eskilstuna)
"När vi två blir en" - 4:12 (Stockholm)
"Det är över nu" - 3:36 (Jönköping)
"(Kom så ska vi) Leva livet" - 3:30 (Gothenburg)
"Tylö Sun" (California Sun) - 2:48 (Helsingborg)
"Gå & fiska!" - 4:21 (Jönköping)
"Billy" - 5:42 (Eskilstuna)
"Ta mej... nu är jag din!"
"Medley" - 8:43 (Halmstad II)
"Sommartider"
"Min tjej och jag"
"Vänta på mej!"
"Flickan i en Cole Porter-sång"
"Sommartider"
"När alla vännerna gått hem" - 4:35 (Eskilstuna)

Charts

References

External links
 Gyllene tider - Diskografi
 Elektroniska tider - GT25 Live!

2004 live albums
Gyllene Tider live albums